Operation Horev was a large scale offensive against the Egyptian army in the Western Negev at the end of the Arab–Israeli War in 1948 and 1949. Its objective was to trap the Egyptian Army in the Gaza Strip. The operation started on 22 December 1948 and ended on 7 January 1949, after the British threatened to intervene.

Horev is the name given in the Scriptures for Mount Sinai, where the Israelites encamped for a year (Exodus 3:1 and Psalms 106:19): in modern parlance it is called the Jebel Musa ("Mount of Moses" in Arabic).

Objectives

The first objective of the offensive was the Egyptian army units defending al-Auja on the Palestinian-Egyptian border. From there the major thrust was to the Egyptian army bases at El-Arish. This would trap the majority of the Egyptian army in the Gaza Strip.

The operation's commander was Yigal Alon. Five Israeli brigades were involved: The 8th Armoured Brigade commanded by Yitzhak Sadeh; the Negev Brigade; the Golani Brigade; the Harel Brigade; and the Alexandroni Brigade. Their task was to maintain the siege of the 4,000 strong Egyptian brigade at Faluja.
The Egyptians had a further two brigades in the Gaza area, and one more brigade across the border near El-Arish.

Campaign

On 22 December a battalion from the Golani brigade launched a diversionary attack on positions near the Gaza-Rafah road. In preparation for the offensive, the Israeli army had been able to clear a route through the desert, by-passing the defences on the Beersheba to al-Auja road. On 27 December 1948 the Armoured Brigade attacked al-Auja from this unexpected quarter. After 24 hours of fighting, the Egyptians surrendered in disarray. With this victory Alon realised that there were no Egyptian defences left west of el-Arish and was prepared to capture the entire Sinai peninsula. The Negev brigade followed the tanks of the 8th brigade across the Egyptian border on the night of 28 December and moved towards El-Arish. By 30 December 1948 they were on the outskirts of the town's airfield. At the same time units from the Harel brigade moved further west into Sinai. On 29 December the United Nations Security Council ordered a cease-fire.

Outcome
Before he could complete his objective, Allon was instructed by the Israeli Prime Minister, David Ben-Gurion, to withdraw from Egypt immediately. The British Government had threatened to invoke the 1936 Anglo-Egyptian Treaty of Friendship and become directly involved. Under protest but at Ben-Gurion's insistence, the Israelis withdrew. On 3 January they launched an attack on the Egyptian defences at Rafah with the same objective of trapping the Egyptian army. After three days of fighting around Rafah, the Egyptian government announced on 6 January 1949, that they were willing to enter armistice negotiations. On the same day the Israeli Air Force shot down five RAF Spitfires on patrol in the area, killing two pilots and taking two more prisoner. The British moved reinforcements to Akaba. Despite protests from the army, Israel accepted the cease-fire on 7 January. 

In the final Armistice Agreement al-Auja was made a de-militarized zone.

See also 
 Battles of the Sinai (1948)

References

Horev
December 1948 events in Africa
January 1949 events in Africa
December 1948 events in Asia
January 1949 events in Asia